Raymond ("Ray") Boyd (born 28 June 1951) is a former athlete from Australia, who competed in the Pole vault.

Boyd won eleven Australian Championships in the Pole Vault, ending his career on a high note when winning the gold medal at the 1982 Commonwealth Games in Brisbane.  He competed in two Olympics and three Commonwealth Games from 1970 to 1982. He was coached by Wal Chisholm.

Boyd's best vault of 5.30 metres was achieved in Melbourne on 15 March 1976.

His wife, Denise Boyd (née Robertson) was also a Commonwealth Games champion and double-Olympic finalist at 200 metres. The Boyds have three children, all of whom are successful athletes:

Alana (born 10 May 1984) - 4.81 m Pole Vaulter
Jacinta (born 10 February 1986) - 6.64 m Long Jumper
Matthew (Matt) (born 29 April 1988) - 5.35 m Pole Vaulter

Ray is Alana, Jacinta and Matthew 's coach for training.

See also
 Australian athletics champions

References

1951 births
Living people
Australian male pole vaulters
Olympic athletes of Australia
Athletes (track and field) at the 1972 Summer Olympics
Athletes (track and field) at the 1976 Summer Olympics
Athletes (track and field) at the 1970 British Commonwealth Games
Athletes (track and field) at the 1974 British Commonwealth Games
Athletes (track and field) at the 1982 Commonwealth Games
Commonwealth Games gold medallists for Australia
Commonwealth Games medallists in athletics
Medallists at the 1982 Commonwealth Games